Givanildo José de Oliveira (born 8 August 1948), sometimes known as just Givanildo, is a Brazilian retired footballer who played as a defensive midfielder, and is the manager of America.

Playing career

Club
Born in Olinda, Pernambuco, Givanildo Oliveira represented Santa Cruz as a youth and made his first team debut in 1969. A part of the club's five consecutive Campeonato Pernambucano titles, he also became team captain in the process.

In 1976 Givanildo Oliveira moved to Corinthians, but was sparingly used and subsequently returned to Santa in the following year. In 1980, after a short stint at Fluminense, he joined state rivals Sport, eventually retiring with the club in 1983 at nearly 35 years of age.

International
Givanildo Oliveira represented Brazil on 13 occasions (six of them official), with his debut occurring on 31 May 1976 in a 4–1 routing of Italy for the 1976 U.S.A. Bicentennial Cup Tournament.

Managerial career
Givanildo Oliveira's first managerial job came on 1983 at Sport, immediately after retiring. His first accolade as a manager occurred in 1986, as he won the Campeonato Alagoano with CRB.

In 1987, while in charge of Paysandu, Givanildo Oliveira won the year's Campeonato Paraense, and subsequently returned to his first club Santa Cruz in 1989. He left the club in the following year, and was subsequently in charge of CSA (two stints), Paysandu, Sport (three stints), Central, Ponte Preta (two stints), Remo, Bragantino, CRB, Náutico (two stints), Guarani, Bahia and América Mineiro; with the latter he achieved promotion to the Série A in 1997.

In 1998, Givanildo Oliveira rejoined Santa after leaving América, and went back to Paysandu in April 2000, leading the latter club to the top tier in 2001 and winning the 2002 Copa dos Campeões, which qualified his side to the 2003 Copa Libertadores. He resigned in September 2002, and subsequently took over Náutico.

In April 2003, Givanildo Oliveira was named manager of Remo, and left the club in December. For the 2004 season, he was named manager five times in four clubs; starting with Paysandu, he only lasted one month before turning out to Fortaleza. He eventually returned to Papão in April, being dismissed in August and taking over Remo, but finished the campaign in charge of Santa Cruz.

Givanildo Oliveira remained in charge of Santa Cruz until April 2006, when he resigned to take over Atlético Paranaense. Dismissed in July, he led Sport to the second place of the Série B.

In 2007, Givanildo Oliveira had unassuming spells at Santa Cruz, Vitória and Brasiliense; at the latter, he was in charge for just three matches, all defeats. He returned to Paysandu for the 2008 season, but stepped down and took over Vila Nova in April, staying at the club until the following February.

On 17 March 2009, Givanildo Oliveira was appointed manager of Mogi Mirim, but moved to América Mineiro the following month. On 10 November, after winning the Série C with the latter, he took over Sport.

On 19 July 2010, Givanildo Oliveira returned to Santa. In September he resigned, and took over Ponte Preta on 25 October.

On 18 May 2011, Givanildo Oliveira rejoined Remo for a fourth spell. On 1 August he returned to América Mineiro, and subsequently took over Paysandu (two stints), ABC and Treze before rejoining the club on 17 September 2014.

On 3 June 2016, Givanildo Oliveira was sacked by América. On 5 September, he took over Náutico, but was dismissed on 2 December after failing to achieve promotion.

On 17 February 2017, Givanildo Oliveira was announced at Ceará. On 2 July he returned to Santa Cruz for a sixth spell, but was relieved from his duties on 27 August.

On 27 February 2018, Givanildo Oliveira rejoined Remo. Sacked on 27 May, he took over América Mineiro for the fifth time on 11 November.

Honours

Player
 Santa Cruz 
 Campeonato Pernambucano: 1969, 1970, 1971, 1972, 1973, 1978, 1979

 Corinthians
 Campeonato Paulista: 1977

 Fluminense 
 Campeonato Carioca: 1980

 Sport 
 Campeonato Pernambucano: 1980, 1981, 1982

Manager 
 CRB
 Campeonato Alagoano: 1986

 Paysandu
 Campeonato Paraense: 1987, 1992, 2000, 2001, 2002
 Campeonato Brasileiro Série B: 2001
 Copa dos Campeões: 2002
 Copa Norte: 2002

 CSA
 Campeonato Alagoano: 1990

 Remo
 Campeonato Paraense: 1993, 1994, 2018

 Sport
 Campeonato Pernambucano: 1992, 1994, 2010
 Copa do Nordeste: 1994

 América Mineiro
 Campeonato Brasileiro Série B: 1997 
 Campeonato Brasileiro Série C: 2009
 Campeonato Mineiro: 2016

 Santa Cruz 
 Campeonato Pernambucano: 2005
    
 Vitória
 Campeonato Baiano: 2007 

 Ceará
 Campeonato Cearense: 2017

References

External links

1948 births
Living people
People from Olinda
Brazilian footballers
Association football midfielders
Campeonato Brasileiro Série A players
Santa Cruz Futebol Clube players
Sport Club Corinthians Paulista players
Fluminense FC players
Sport Club do Recife players
Brazil international footballers
Brazilian football managers
Campeonato Brasileiro Série A managers
Campeonato Brasileiro Série B managers
Campeonato Brasileiro Série C managers
Sport Club do Recife managers
Associação Desportiva Confiança managers
Central Sport Club managers
Clube Náutico Capibaribe managers
ABC Futebol Clube managers
Clube de Regatas Brasil managers
Paysandu Sport Club managers
Santa Cruz Futebol Clube managers
Centro Sportivo Alagoano managers
Associação Atlética Ponte Preta managers
Clube do Remo managers
Clube Atlético Bragantino managers
Guarani FC managers
Esporte Clube Bahia managers
América Futebol Clube (MG) managers
Fortaleza Esporte Clube managers
Club Athletico Paranaense managers
Esporte Clube Vitória managers
Brasiliense Futebol Clube managers
Vila Nova Futebol Clube managers
Mogi Mirim Esporte Clube managers
Treze Futebol Clube managers
Ceará Sporting Club managers
America Football Club (RJ) managers
Sportspeople from Pernambuco